XV Jose Iturbi International Piano Competition took place in Valencia, from September 14 to the 30th, 2006. The competition is held every two years and is a member of the Geneva  World Federation of International Music Competitions. Pianist Josu De Solaun Soto was given the First Grand Prize, becoming the first Spanish pianist to be awarded such distinction in the 25 years of the competition's existence. The prize included over $25,000, recital and orchestral engagements and a recording contract.

Jury

 Joaquín Soriano (president)
 Sulamita Aronovsky
 Sergei Dorensky
 Miguel Ángel Herranz
 Jaime Ingram
 Mi Kyung Kim
 Natalie Michailidou
 Fernando Puchol
 Leslie Wright (substituting  Jean-Bernard Pommier)
 Oxana Yablonskaya

Prizes

Compositions commissioned for the competition
 Joan Cerveró - Verdi
 Carlos Fontcuberta - Après tout [ Performance by Miguel Á. Castro ]
 Voro García Fernández - Etoiles filantes

Competition Results (by Rounds)

First round

Second round

Third round

Semifinals

Final

External links
 History of the Competition, since 1981; PREVIOUS WINNERS
  Interview with Josu De Solaun Soto
 Directory of International Piano Competitions

José Iturbi International Piano Competition
September 2006 events in Europe
2006 in Spanish music
History of Valencia